The Detroit Rockers were an indoor soccer team in the National Professional Soccer League from 1990 to 2001. They played in Joe Louis Arena and Cobo Arena in downtown Detroit, Michigan as well as The Palace of Auburn Hills and Compuware Sports Arena in the suburbs. For a time, they were led by star player-coach Andy Chapman until he was lured away by the more deep-pocketed Detroit Neon in 1994. The big stars of the Rockers included Drago Dumbovic and goalie Bryan "Goose" Finnerty. The Rockers won the 1991–1992 NPSL Championship. The Rockers outlasted the home-town rival Neon only because the Neon folded with their league the CISL.The Rockers themselves finally folded in 2001 when the NPSL ceased operations. Until the Rockers folded, they were owned by businessmen from Walled Lake.

Year-by-year

Ownership & Staff
 David Woodrow – Co-Owner / General Manager
 Gary Miller – Co-Owner / General Manager

Coaches
 Brian Tinnion 1990–1994
 Pato Margetic 1994–1999
 Drago 1999–2000
 Brian Tinnion 2000–2001

Honors
MVP
 Andy Chapman: 1991
 Dan O'Keefe: 1992

Leading scorer
 Andy Chapman: 1991
 Dan O'Keefe: 1992

Defender of the Year
 Sean Bowers: 1994, 1995

Rookie of the Year
 Goose Finnerty: 1991
 Sean Bowers: 1992
 Jason Willen: 1996
 Travis Roy: 1998

Coach of the Year
 Brian Tinnion: 1991

First Team All Star
 1991: Andy Chapman
 1992: Dan O'Keefe
 1993: Sean Bowers
 1994: Sean Bowers, Andy Chapman
 1995: Sean Bowers
 1997: Dennis Brose

Media coverage
In Detroit, the Rockers could be seen on Barden Cablevision and Pro-Am Sports System with Ian Parratt, Brian Tinnion, and Detroit Free Press columnist Bill Roose among the commentators.

References

Defunct indoor soccer clubs in the United States
National Professional Soccer League (1984–2001) teams
R
Soccer clubs in Michigan
Sports in Auburn Hills, Michigan
Sports in Oakland County, Michigan
1990 establishments in Michigan
2001 disestablishments in Michigan
Sports in Plymouth Township, Michigan
Association football clubs established in 1990
Association football clubs disestablished in 2001